The Tasman Island, part of the Tasman Island Group, is an oval island with an area of , lying close to the south-eastern coast of Tasmania, Australia.  The island is located in the Tasman Sea, situated off the Tasman Peninsula and is contained within the Tasman National Park.

It is the site of the Tasman Island Lighthouse and weather station, which has been automated since 1976 and unstaffed since 1977.

Flora and fauna

Plants
The island was once thickly forested.  The forest has largely disappeared as a result of cutting the trees for firewood and of intense fires.  When the lighthouse was staffed the keepers kept livestock, including cattle, sheep and draught horses, and maintained grassland for their grazing.  Areas of grassland remain along with other vegetation communities of heathy scrub, regenerating scrub, sheoak woodland, sedgeland and coastal mosaic.  An important plant present is the rare Cape Pillar Sheoak (Allocasuarina crassa).

Birds
Tasman Island is a very important breeding site for fairy prions, with an estimated 300,000-700,000 pairs, making it the largest such colony in Tasmania, and possibly in Australia.  It has been identified as an Important Bird Area (IBA) by BirdLife International because it supports over 1% of the world population of the species.  Other recorded breeding seabird species are little penguin (now extinct there as a breeding species), short-tailed shearwater and sooty shearwater.  The swamp harrier has also bred on the island.

The breeding seabirds were preyed on by a feral cat population estimated at 50, feeding mainly on fairy prions and taking about 50,000 birds annually.  The cats were eradicated by a baiting, trapping and hunting program carried out in May 2010.

Other animals
Australian and New Zealand fur seals use the rocky shore as a haul-out site, and the latter species has bred there in small numbers.  Humpback whales pass through the surrounding waters.  Reptiles recorded from the island include the metallic skink, White's skink, spotted skink and she-oak skink.  A notable invertebrate, so far recorded only from Tasman Island, is the cricket Tasmanoplectron isolatum.

Climate

Gallery

See also

 List of islands of Tasmania

References

External links
 Restoring the Natural Values of Tasman Island

Islands of Tasmania
Protected areas of Tasmania
Important Bird Areas of Tasmania
Tasman National Park